The following are the national records in athletics in Madagascar maintained by Malagasy national athletics federation: Federation Malagasy d'Athletisme.

Outdoor

Key to tables:

h = hand timing

Mx = mixed race

Men

Women

Indoor

Men

Women

Notes

References

External links

Malagasy
Athletics
Records
Athletics